The boys' slopestyle event at the 2016 Winter Youth  Olympics took place on 19 February at the Hafjell Freepark.

Results

References

External links
Results (PDF)
 

Snowboarding at the 2016 Winter Youth Olympics